The Panel on Takeovers and Mergers, or more commonly The Takeover Panel, is the United Kingdom's regulatory body charged with the administration of The Takeover Code.

It was set up in 1968 and is located in London, England.

Its role is to ensure that all shareholders are treated equally during takeover bids. Its main functions are to issue and administer the City Code on Takeovers and Mergers (the "Code") and to supervise and regulate takeovers and other matters to which the Code applies. Its central objective is to ensure fair treatment for all shareholders in takeover bids.

Powers 

The Panel is a statutory body under Chapter 1 of Part 28 (sections 942 to 965) of the Companies Act 2006 as amended by The Companies Act 2006 (Amendment of Schedule 2)(No 2) Order 2009. It has established a reputation for giving informed advice in an expert area of regulatory activity.  It is the de facto arbiter of takeover bids and has the support of government and other organisations with statutory involvement.

The European Takeovers Directive mandates that the Panel is put on a statutory footing. This was completed in the Companies Act 2006.

Whenever a transaction is made on the LSE or other London-based exchange that is greater than £10,000, the details of the transaction are passed on to the panel for their evaluation, and a levy is charged of (currently) £1.00 on the transaction, which goes to the panel as payment (known as the "PTM levy").

It was decided in R v Panel on Take-overs and Mergers, ex p Datafin plc that decisions of this panel are subject to judicial review, even though it was at that time (i.e., in 1986) only a private body. This was due to its "enormous power" and "giant's strength". As The Panel is now a statutory footing, its decisions can now be reviewed even without referring to this case.

Director Generals
The Takeover Panel has been led by the following individuals since inception:
1968-72: Ian Fraser 
1972-74: John Hull, Schroders
1974-76: Martin Harris
1976-79: David Macdonald, Hill Samuel
1979-81: Graham Walsh, Morgan Grenfell
1981-83: J.M. Hignett, Lazard
1983-85: T G Barker
1985-87: John Walker-Haworth, a Director of S G Warburg
1987-89: Antony Beevor, Hambros
1989-92: Geoffrey Barnett, Barings
1992-94: Frances Heaton, Lazard
1994-96: William Staple, Rothschild
1996-98: Alistair Defriez, SBC Warburg
1998-01: Patrick Drayton, Schroders
2001-03: Philip Remnant, Credit Suisse First Boston
2003-05: Richard Murley, Goldman Sachs
2005-07: Mark Warham, Morgan Stanley
2007-10: Robert Hingley, Lexicon
2010 (interim): Philip Remnant
2010-13 Robert Gillespie, Evercore
2013-15: Philip Robert-Tissot, Citigroup
2015-18: Crispin Wright, Rothschild
2018-21: Simon Lindsay, Citigroup
2021-: Ian Hart, UBS

International equivalents

References

External links 

Organisations based in the City of London
United Kingdom company law
1968 establishments in the United Kingdom
Financial regulatory authorities of the United Kingdom
Mergers and acquisitions
Non-departmental public bodies of the United Kingdom government
Corporate governance in the United Kingdom